Aye Kyi, better known by his stage name Shwe Ba (30 March 1918 – 1 December 1988), was a Burmese actor and director. He founded the film group known as Thamada Lu Gyan, which produced popular action films in the late 1940s.

In 1983, Shwe Ba was admitted to Yangon General Hospital for emergency surgery. He died from heart disease on 1 December 1988, at the age of 70.

Notes

References

1918 births
1988 deaths
Burmese male film actors
People from Ayeyarwady Region